Cymbuliidae is a family of pelagic sea snails or "sea butterflies", marine gastropod mollusks in the superfamily Cymbulioidea.

Description 
Instead of an external calcareous shell, they possess a pseudoconch, consisting of conchioline, a cartilaginous tissue. The mantle and the gill have disappeared as well. They breathe through the skin. They prefer warm water.

Distribution 
Cymbuliidae are found in all marine waters between -54 and 55°N.

Subfamilies 
The family Cymbuliidae consists of two following subfamilies (according to the taxonomy of the Gastropoda by Bouchet & Rocroi, 2005):
 subfamily Cymbuliinae Gray, 1840
 subfamily Glebinae van der Spoel, 1976

Genera 
Genera within the family Cymbuliidae include:

subfamily Cymbuliinae
 Cymbulia Péron & Lesueur, 1810 - type genus of the family Cymbuliidae
 Cymbulia parvidentata Pelseneer, 1888 - Distribution: Bermuda, Oceanic. Length: 35 mm.
 Cymbulia peronii Lamarck, 1819 - Distribution: Florida, Mexico, Brazil, Argentina, Oceanic. Length: 65 mm.
 Cymbulia sibogae Tesch, 1903 - Distribution: Brazil, Argentina, Oceanic. Length: 24 mm.
 Corolla Dall, 1871

subfamily Glebinae
 Gleba Forsskål, 1776 - type genus of the subfamily Glebinae
 Gleba chrysosticta Troschel, 1854: synonym of Corolla chrysosticta (Troschel, 1854)
 Gleba cordata Forskål, 1776 - Distribution: Florida, Bermuda, Oceanic. Length: 45 mm.

References

External links 

 
Taxa named by John Edward Gray